Edmund Arthur Lowndes de Waal,  (born 10 September 1964) is a contemporary English artist, master potter and author. He is known for his large-scale installations of porcelain vessels often created in response to collections and archives or the history of a particular place. De Waal's book The Hare with Amber Eyes was awarded the Costa Book Award for Biography, Royal Society of Literature Ondaatje Prize in 2011 and Windham–Campbell Literature Prize for Non-Fiction in 2015. De Waal's second book The White Road, tracing his journey to discover the history of porcelain was released in 2015.

He lives and works in London.

Early life
De Waal was born in Nottingham, England, the son of Esther Aline (née Lowndes-Moir) a renowned historian and expert in Celtic mythology and Victor de Waal, a chaplain of the University of Nottingham who later became the Dean of Canterbury Cathedral. His grandfather was Hendrik de Waal, a Dutch businessman who moved to England. His paternal grandmother Elisabeth and great grandfather Viktor von Ephrussi were members of the Ephrussi family, a history of which was chronicled in The Hare with Amber Eyes. Elisabeth de Waal's first novel, The Exiles Return, was published by Persephone Books in 2013. De Waal's siblings include barrister John de Waal (husband of author Kit de Waal), Alex de Waal who is director of the World Peace Foundation, and Caucasus expert Thomas de Waal.

Education and early ceramic work
De Waal's interest in ceramics began at age of five when he took an evening class at the Lincoln School of Art, this early introduction to pottery influenced de Waal's later enthusiasm for pursuing an art practice based in ceramics.

De Waal was educated at The King's School, Canterbury, where he was taught pottery by the potter Geoffrey Whiting (1919-1988), a student of Bernard Leach. At 17, de Waal began a two-year apprenticeship with Whiting, deferring his entry into University of Cambridge. During the apprenticeship de Waal made hundreds of earthenware and stoneware pots, such as casseroles and honey pots. In 1983, de Waal took up his place at Trinity Hall, Cambridge, to read English. He was awarded a scholarship in 1983 and graduated with first class honours in 1986.

Following graduation, de Waal began to follow the discipline of British studio pottery, to create inexpensive domestic pots with good earth-tone colours. He moved to Herefordshire where he built a kiln and set up a pottery making functional stoneware pots in the Leach tradition, but the enterprise was not financially successful. In 1988, de Waal moved to inner-city Sheffield and began experimenting with working in porcelain.

In 1990 de Waal obtained a Daiwa Anglo-Japanese Foundation Scholarship, under which he spent a year obtaining a post-graduate diploma in Japanese language at Sheffield University and continued an additional year's study. Whilst studying in Japan at the Mejiro Ceramics studio de Waal also worked on a monograph of Bernard Leach, researching his papers and journals in the archive room of the Japanese Folk Crafts Museum. During this time de Waal began to make series of porcelain jars with pushed-in, gestural sides, arranged in groups and sequences.

Art and ceramics
On returning to Britain in 1993, de Waal settled in London and began making his distinctive ceramics, porcelain with a celadon glaze. Focusing on essentially classical vessel shapes but with the inclusion of indentations or pinches and subtle variations in tone and texture in the style de Waal began while in Japan, these pots slowly gained the attention of the British craft industry leading to his first exhibition at Egg London in 1995.

Throughout the late 1990s and early 2000s de Waal's ceramic practice became heavily influenced by modernism, the Bauhaus movement in particular. This led to de Waal's belief that the East and West may meet in the materiality of porcelain; for example, the ethos of China's Song dynasty may encounter the modernist ethos of the Bauhaus.

In the years since 2000 de Waal has moved away from making and exhibiting single domestic use vessels to the production of groups of vessels and objects to be viewed in relation to openings and spaces, later moving into predominately wall-mounted and freestanding vitrines filled with varying multitudes of his porcelain vessels, and most recently the addition of different kinds of metals, metallic gilding, porcelain shards and sheets of porcelain with embossed handwriting. In a 2017 interview conducted in preparation for de Waal's exhibition at Artipelag, Sweden, de Waal explained his artistic process and attraction to porcelain as a material:when I need to make something I'm often mesmerised or haunted by an idea or by a piece of poetry. A line from poetry, a word sometimes, or a piece of music, or a space that I've been thinking about, a particular place that I want to kind of question by making something for it. So, there are all these different possibilities when I begin. I am grounded in history, the history and culture of the materials I use, this extraordinary two-thousand-year history of porcelain. I don't use this material lightly. It’s not a light material. It's got incredible resonance, incredible power.

In 2013 BBC One broadcast an Imagine documentary following de Waal for a year as he prepared for his debut New York exhibition, Atemwende at Gagosian Gallery; titled and inspired by a poetry collection from the German émigré poet Paul Celan.

De Waal discussed the influence of music and sound on his art practice in various interviews, including the BBC Radio 3 programme Private Passions, BBC Desert Island Discs and in a 2017 interview, de Waal mentioned, "I am obviously on some spectrum where for me objects do actually have very powerful sound. I do literally hear them when I put them out." In addition, de Waal plays recorded music aloud in his studio while making and assembling his work, that this provides "a landscape for [him] to be in" when working. De Waal has collaborated with musicians on various projects, including Psalm, in 2015 by the Scottish composer Martin Suckling with the Aurora Orchestra; and an atmospheric sound piece by Simon Fisher Turner as a part of the 2017 Schindler House exhibition.

De Waal has exhibited major installations at Chatsworth, Kettle's Yard, Tate Britain, Fitzwilliam Museum, Southwark Cathedral, Kunsthistorisches Museum (including a commission for the Theseus Temple in the Volksgarten, Vienna), and the Victoria and Albert Museum.

In 2012 he received his first outdoor public art commission, for the Alison Richard Building at the Sidgwick Site of the University of Cambridge, where he created A Local History, consisting of three vitrines filled with porcelain to sit beneath the pavement surrounding the building.  In 2015 de Waal curated the exhibition White in the Royal Academy of Arts Library and Print Room. The "project ... sets objects in dialogue with one another and with the spaces around them" and included works by Ai Weiwei, Kazimir Malevich's Suprematist Teapot and J. M. W. Turner's porcelain palette. In September 2016 de Waal collaborated with the artist Ai Weiwei to co-curate an exhibition, Kneaded Knowledge: The Language of Ceramics at the National Gallery in Prague and Kunsthaus Graz exploring the history of clay. The exhibition featured works by both artists and from other prominent artists working in ceramics, including Pablo Picasso, Lucio Fontana, Isamu Noguchi, Lucie Rie and Peter Voulkos.

Since 2016 de Waal has continued his interest in working with arts and cultural institutions in installing his work in relationship and dialogue with existing museum collections such as the Frick Collection, historical architectural spaces such as Schindler House and the Ateneo Veneto; and engagement with Jewish museums in both Venice and Vienna. De Waal make his Royal Ballet debut in the 2017–18 Season designing Wayne McGregor’s new ballet, Yugen, at the Royal Opera House. Set to The Chichester Psalms, the production formed part of a programme celebrating the centenary of Leonard Bernstein's birth.

De Waal is a patron of Paintings in Hospitals, a charity providing art for health and social care in England, Wales and Northern Ireland, and from 2015 to 2020 de Waal was a trustee of the National Saturday Club, an educational charity for young people. In 2018, de Waal was re-appointed to the Royal Mint Advisory Committee for another term of five years. From 2004 to 2011, de Waal was professor of Ceramics at the University of Westminster; and a trustee of the Victoria & Albert Museum, London from 2011 to 2019. De Waal has been a trustee of the Gilbert Trust since 2013 and in 2020 became a co-opted member of the V&A Museum of Childhood.

Writing 

In 1998 De Waal published a monograph on Bernard Leach with research collected while studying in Japan. The book challenges the public understanding of Leach's as the great and original interlocutor for Japan and the East as the 20th century potter who translated the mystery of the East to audiences in the West. De Waal's research into Leach in Japan revealed that he predominantly associated himself with Western educated Japanese people, did not speak Japanese and studied only a narrow range of traditional Japanese ceramics. Due to Leach's status in the West as the "Father of British studio ceramics" and the influence of his Eastern techniques and philosophy, De Waal's views attracted criticism from some of Leach's followers.

In 2010 de Waal's family memoir, The Hare with Amber Eyes: a Hidden Inheritance, was published, first by Chatto & Windus in the UK and later by Farrar, Straus and Giroux in New York City. The book traces the history of de Waal's Jewish relatives (from his paternal grandmother, Elisabeth), the wealthy and influential Ephrussi family, by telling stories surrounding a collection of 264 Japanese netsuke – miniature ivory and wood sculptures traditionally used as toggles on men's kimono, to attach carrying pouches. The collection of netsuke were originally purchased by Charles Ephrussi in Paris in the 1870s, and were handed down through the generations and eventually given to de Waal by his great-uncle Ignace "Iggie" Ephrussi, who settled in Tokyo after the Second World War. The book received critical acclaim, and brought de Waal the Costa Book Award for biography in 2010, as well as the Galaxy New Writer of the Year Book Award and the Royal Society of Literature's Ondaatje Prize. It has sold over a million copies and has been published in more than 25 languages.

The Ephrussis. Travel in Time, an exhibition surrounding the story of the Ephrussi family told by de Waal in his family memoir The Hare with Amber Eyes, tracing their history from Odessa to Paris and Vienna; then to their migration as refugees as the Second World War forced them to seek asylum in the United Kingdom, the US and Mexico, and onto Japan and other countries, opened at the Jewish Museum Vienna in November 2019.

De Waal's second book, The White Road, was published by Chatto & Windus in 2015 and was aired on BBC Radio 4's Book of the Week. It follows de Waal's journey to discover the history of porcelain, from porcelain first made in the hills of Jingdezhen in China to the first makers of English porcelain, William Cookworthy and Josiah Wedgwood; and the development of porcelain manufacture in Dresden in the early 18th century during the reign of Augustus the Strong, ruler of Saxony, by Johann Friedrich Böttger and Ehrenfried Walther von Tschirnhaus and later in Nazi Germany the porcelain manufacture Allach, a project by Heinrich Himmler, run by the SS with forced labor provided by the Dachau concentration camp.

De Waal's third book, Letters to Camondo, was published by Chatto & Windus in May 2021.

Major exhibitions and installations 

1995, Edmund de Waal. Egg, London.
1999 Modern Home. High Cross House, Dartington Hall, Devon.
2002 Porcelain Room. Geffrye Museum, London.
2002 A Long Line West. Egg, London.
2005 Arcanum: mapping 18th-Century European porcelain. National Museums and Galleries of Wales, Cardiff.
2005 A line around a shadow. Blackwell, Bowness-on-Windermere, Cumbria.
2006 Vessel, perhaps. Millgate Museum, Newark-on-Trent, Nottinghamshire.
2007 Edmund de Waal at Kettle's Yard, MIMA and elsewhere. Kettle's Yard, Cambridge, Middlesbrough Institute of Modern Art.
2007 A Sounding Line. Chatsworth House, Derbyshire.
2009 Signs & Wonders. Victoria and Albert Museum, London.
2010 From Zero. Alan Cristea Gallery (now known as Cristea Roberts Gallery), London.
2012 Edmund de Waal at Waddesdon. Waddesdon Manor, Buckinghamshire.
2012 a local history. Alison Richard Building, University of Cambridge.
2012 a thousand hours. Alan Cristea Gallery (now known as Cristea Roberts Gallery), London.
2013 On White: Porcelain stories from the Fitzwilliam Museum. Fitzwilliam Museum, Cambridge.
2013 Atemwende. Gagosian Gallery, New York.
2014 atmosphere. Turner Contemporary, Margate.
2014 another hour. Southwark Cathedral, London.
2014 Lichtzwang. Theseus Temple, Vienna.
2015 wavespeech. A joint exhibition with David Ward. Pier Arts Centre, Orkney.
2015 white: A Project by Edmund de Waal. Royal Academy of Arts, London.
2016 ten thousand things. Gagosian Gallery, Beverley Hills.
2016 Irrkunst. Galerie Max Hetzler, Berlin.
2016 Kneaded Knowledge with Ai Weiwei. Kunsthaus Graz, Graz.
2016 During the Night. Kunsthistorisches Museum, Vienna.
2017 Lettres de Londres. Espace Muraille, Geneva.
2017 Morandi / Edmund de Waal. Artipelag, Stockholm.
2018 white island. Museu d’Art Contemporani d’Eivissa, Ibiza.
2018 – one way or other – Schindler House, Los Angeles.
2018 the poems of our climate, Gagosian Gallery, San Francisco.
2019 breath. Ivory Press, Madrid.
2019 psalm. Museo Ebraico di Venezia and Ateneo Veneto, Venice.
2019 Elective Affinities. The Frick Collection, New York.
2019 a sort of speech. Galerie Max Hetzler, Berlin.
2019 im Goldhaus. Porzellansammlung, Staatliche Kunstsammlungen, Dresden.
2019 Library of Exile. Japanisches Palais, Staatliche Kunstsammlungen, Dresden.
2020 Library of Exile. The British Museum, London.
2020 some winter pots. Gagosian Gallery, London.
2020 tacet. New Art Centre, Salisbury.
2020 cold mountain clay. Gagosian Gallery, Hong Kong.
2021 This Living Hand: Edmund de Waal presents Henry Moore. Henry Moore Studios & Gardens, Perry Green.
2021-2022 Hare With Amber Eyes.

Awards and honours
1991–1993 Daiwa Anglo-Japanese Foundation Scholarship.
1996 Fellow of Royal Society of Arts.
1999–2001 The Leverhulme Trust Special Research Fellowship.
2003 Silver Medal, World Ceramic Exposition, Korea.
2009 Honorary Fellow, Trinity Hall, University of Cambridge.
2011 Honorary degree from the University for the Creative Arts.
2011 Costa Book Awards, winner (Biography), The Hare with Amber Eyes.
2011 Royal Society of Literature Ondaatje Prize, winner, The Hare with Amber Eyes.
2011 Order of the British Empire (OBE) for Service to the Arts.
2011 to present, Trustee of the Victoria and Albert Museum, London.
2012 Senior Fellowship Royal College of Art, London.
2013 Honorary Doctorate of Letters University of Sheffield.
2013 Honorary Doctorate University of the Arts, London.
2014 Honorary Doctorate Canterbury Christ Church University.
2014 Honorary Doctorate, University of Nottingham.
2015 Windham–Campbell Literature Prize for Non-Fiction.
2016 Honorary Doctorate, University of York.
2017 London Craft Week Medal.
2019 Harman/Eisner Artist in Residence at the Aspen Institute Arts Program.
2021 Fellow of the Royal Society of Literature.

De Waal was appointed Officer of the Order of the British Empire (OBE) in 2011 and Commander of the Order of the British Empire (CBE) in the 2021 Birthday Honours, both for services to the arts.

Bibliography

Books

 Letters to Camondo London: Chatto & Windus. 2021. 
The White Road. London / New York: Chatto & Windus / Farrar, Straus & Giroux. 2015. 
Edmund de Waal. London: Phaidon Press. 2014. 
 The Pot Book. London: Phaidon Press. 2011. 
 The Hare with Amber Eyes: a hidden inheritance. London / New York:  Chatto & Windus / Farrar, Straus & Giroux. 2010. 
 Rethinking Bernard Leach: Studio Pottery and Contemporary Ceramics, with Kenji Kaneko. Kyoto: Shibunkaku Publishing. 2007. 
 20th Century Ceramics. London: Thames and Hudson. 2003. 
 Design Sourcebook: Ceramics. London: New Holland Publishers. 1999. 
 Bernard Leach. London: Tate Publishing. 1998.

Catalogues
elective affinities. New York, USA. The Frick Collection. 2019. 
breath. Madrid, Spain. Ivorypress. 2019.
wavespeech. Bath, UK: Wunderkammer Press. 2018. 
Edmund de Waal / Morandi. Stockholm, Sweden: Artipelag. 2017. 
Kneaded Knowledge. Cologne, Austria: Universalmuseum Joanneum, Graz. 2016. 
During the Night. Vienna, Austria: Kunsthistorisches Museum. 2016. 
Irrkunst. Berlin, Germany: Galerie Max Hetzler. 2016. 
ten thousand things. Beverly Hills, CA: Gagosian Gallery. 2016.

Television appearances
What Do Artists Do All Day?
"Make Pots or Die" Imagine (TV series)

References

External links

Official website for The White Road
Official website for Psalm

1964 births
Living people
Artists from Nottingham
English potters
English ceramicists
English contemporary artists
People educated at The King's School, Canterbury
English people of Dutch descent
English people of Austrian-Jewish descent
Alumni of Trinity Hall, Cambridge
Alumni of the University of Sheffield
Ephrussi family
Officers of the Order of the British Empire
English writers